Zhang Lu (born 6 September 1987 in Tianjin) is a Chinese footballer who currently plays for Chinese Super League club Shenzhen.

Club career
Zhang Lu started his football career with Liaoning Whowin in 2005 after graduating from their youth team. Despite his age, he had quickly established himself within the Liaoning squad in his debut season. However while he had firmly established himself as the first choice goalkeeper, by the 2008 league season, he unfortunately saw them relegated to the second tier. Despite this setback, Zhang remained with Liaoning and helped the team win the second division title as well as promotion back to the top tier after only one season.

On 12 January 2016, Zhang transferred to his hometown club Tianjin Quanjian in the China League One. In his first season with the club he would go on to establish himself as their first-choice goalkeeper and win the division title along with promotion to the Chinese Super League. He would establish himself as a vital member of the team and aided them to their highest ever position of third and qualification to the AFC Champions League for the first time in their history.

On 18 September 2019, Zhang has inspected by Traffic Police. A blood test showed that his blood alcohol content was 253.3 mg/100ml (0.2533%). He was detained on 21 September on suspicion of driving under the influence. Chinese Football Association also decided to cancel Zhang's training and competition qualifications for the National Team. He was sentenced to four months' probation on 26 September 2019.

In July 2020, Zhang was one of eight former Tianjin Tianhai players to sign with Shenzhen FC. He would make his debut for Shenzhen in a league game on 28 October 2020 against Shijiazhuang Ever Bright F.C. that ended in a 1-0 victory.

International career
Zhang was included in the preliminary squad to take part in the 2008 Summer Olympics, however he was the third choice keeper and did not make the final eighteen man final squad. While he had limited time with the youth team, he would still go on to make his senior debut for the Chinese national football team in a friendly against Portugal on 3 March 2010 in a 2–0 defeat, however the game was not recognised by FIFA.

Personal life
Zhang was married with Chen Mi (陈密), an anchor of Liaoning Television on 9 November 2013.

Career statistics
Statistics accurate as of match played 4 January 2022.

Honours

Club
Liaoning Whowin
China League One: 2009

Tianjin Quanjian F.C.
China League One: 2016

References

External links
 Player profile at sina.com.cn (Chinese)
 Player stats at sports.sohu.com (Chinese)
 
 

1987 births
Living people
Association football goalkeepers
Chinese footballers
Footballers from Tianjin
China international footballers
Liaoning F.C. players
Tianjin Tianhai F.C. players
Shenzhen F.C. players
Chinese Super League players
China League One players
2019 AFC Asian Cup players